Dynein light chain 1, cytoplasmic is a protein that in humans is encoded by the DYNLL1 gene.

Function 

Cytoplasmic dyneins are large enzyme complexes with a molecular mass of about 1,200 kD. They contain two force-producing heads formed primarily from dynein heavy chains, and stalks linking the heads to a basal domain, which contains a varying number of accessory intermediate chains. The complex is involved in intracellular transport and motility. The protein described in this record is a light chain and exists as part of this complex but also physically interacts with and inhibits the activity of neuronal nitric oxide synthase. Binding of this protein destabilizes the neuronal nitric oxide synthase dimer, a conformation necessary for activity, and it may regulate numerous biologic processes through its effects on nitric oxide synthase activity. Alternate transcriptional splice variants have been characterized.

Interactions 

DYNLL1 has been shown to interact with:

 BCL2L11, 
 DLG4 
 DLGAP1, 
 DYNC1I1, 
 IκBα, 
 MYO5A, 
 NRF1, 
 PAK1,  and
 TP53BP1.

References

Further reading

External links